Skum may refer to:

Music
Skum Rocks!, a 2013 film about a 1980s band named Skum
Skum, a 1970 orchestral composition by Hans Abrahamsen
SKuM, a 2009 album by Abrasive Wheels
"Skum", a song by Non Phixion, from their 2004 album The Green CD/DVD

Other uses
Skum (Dungeons & Dragons), a Dungeons & Dragons monster
Shahrekord University of Medical Sciences, an Iranian medical school commonly abbreviated as SKUMS
Sigma Kappa Upsilon Mu, a social fraternity

See also
Scum (disambiguation)